Jürgen Sobieray (born 2 November 1950) is a retired German footballer who played as a defender. He made 210 appearances in the Bundesliga for Schalke 04 between 1969 and 1979.

References

External links 
 

1950 births
Living people
German footballers
Association football defenders
Bundesliga players
2. Bundesliga players
FC Schalke 04 players
Borussia Dortmund players
Sportspeople from Gelsenkirchen
Footballers from North Rhine-Westphalia
West German footballers